Ana de Miguel Álvarez (born 26 October 1961) is a Spanish philosopher and feminist. Since 2005 she has been a titular professor of Moral and Political Philosophy at King Juan Carlos University of Madrid. She directs the course History of Feminist Theory at the Complutense University of Madrid's .

Biography
Ana de Miguel studied Philosophy at the University of Salamanca and received her doctorate at the Autonomous University of Madrid (UAM). In 1984 she completed her thesis Marxismo y feminismo en Alejandra Kollontai.

Her doctoral thesis is entitled Elites y participación política en la obra de John Stuart Mill. She has also done research on the relationships between feminism and Marxism, on Flora Tristan, and on the Egyptian feminist Qasim Amin.

From 1993 to 2005 she worked as a titular professor of Sociology of Gender at the University of A Coruña. In 2005 she joined King Juan Carlos University of Madrid as a titular professor of Moral and Political Philosophy.

Feminist research

She was a member of the Seminar on Feminism and Illustration created by philosopher Celia Amorós, taught from 1987 to 1994 at the Complutense University. The Seminar was transformed into the research and development project Feminismo, Ilustración y Postmodernidad (1995–1999). This work was added to the studies conducted around the History of Feminist Theory course, started in 1990/91 at the Complutense University's  (in English: Feminist Research Institute) and directed by Ana de Miguel since 2005, and compiled into the three volumes titled Teoría Feminista. De la Ilustración a la globalización.

From 2012 to 2013 she was director of the Master's program in Interdisciplinary Gender Studies at King Juan Carlos University.

One of the basic contributions of her thinking is the reconstruction of a feminist genealogy.

She currently works on feminism as a social movement and its construction of new theoretical frameworks for the interpretation of reality. In this regard, she has distinguished between the politics of redefining reality and the policies of protest. Her latest publications focus on the search for clues to understand how sexual inequality propagates in formally egalitarian societies, especially among young people, on the theoretical framework of gender violence, and on prostitution as a "school of human inequality."

Sexual neoliberalism
In her work Neoliberalismo sexual, de Miguel denounces the neoliberal ideology that aims to turn life, even human beings, into a commodity. She considers that the conversion of women's bodies into merchandise is the most effective means to disseminate and reinforce this ideology, and that the sex industry is connected with it.

In January 2016, she received the First Prize ex aequo from the Social Council of King Juan Carlos University for research excellence in the Arts and Humanities category. In May 2016, her work was recognized with the Ángeles Durán Award for Scientific Innovation in the Study of Women and Gender granted by the UAM's .

Awards
 2015: First Prize ex aequo from the Social Council of King Juan Carlos University for research excellence in the Arts and Humanities category
 2016: Comadre de Oro from the 
 2016: Second Prize at the 23rd Carmen de Burgos Feminist Disclosure Award for the article "La prostitución de mujeres, el harén democrático", published in the Huffington Post 20 January 2015
 2016: Ángeles Durán Award for Scientific Innovation in the Study of Women and Gender (7th edition) from the UAM's 

Publications

Books
 1993: Marxismo y feminismo en Alejandra Kollontai, Madrid, Complutense University – Community of Madrid
 1994: Cómo leer a John Stuart Mill, Madrid, Júcar, 
 2001: Alejandra Kollontai (1872–1952), Madrid, Ediciones del Orto, 
 2002: O feminismo ontem e hoje, Lisbon, Ela por Ela, 
 2005: Celia Amorós and Ana de Miguel (eds.), Teoría feminista. De la Ilustración a la globalización (3 vols.), Madrid, Ediciones Minerva, 
 2015: Neoliberalismo sexual. El mito de la libre elección, Madrid, Cátedra, 
 2017: Nuño Gómez, Laura and de Miguel Álvarez, Ana (dirs.), Fernández Montes, Lidia (coord.), Elementos para una teoría crítica del sistema prostitucional, Granada, Editorial Comares,

Editing, prologues, and translations

 2000: Critical editing, introduction, and co-translation of the 1825 work Appeal of One Half of the Human Race, Women by William Thompson and Anna Wheleer as La demanda de la mitad de la raza humana, las mujeres, Granada, Editorial Comares, 
 2003: Coauthor: introduction and selection of texts for the work Flora Tristán, Feminismo y socialismo, Anthology, Madrid, Los Libros de la Catarata, 
 2005: Prologue to the work El sometimiento de las mujeres (The Subjection of Women) by John Stuart Mill, Madrid, EDAF, 
 2006: Labrys no. 10, Dossier España, "Études féministes/estudos feministas", University of Brasília
 2006: Coordination and introduction of the monograph "Perspectivas feministas en la España del siglo XXI"
 2010: Prologue to the work El mito del varón sustentador, by Laura Nuño, Barcelona, Icaria, 
 2011: Introduction to the John Stuart Mill work El voto y la prostitución, Castilla La Mancha, Almud, 
 2012: Prologue to the Gladys Rocío Ariza Sosa work De inapelable a intolerable: violencia contra las mujeres en sus relaciones de pareja en Medellín, National University of Colombia, Bogotá, 
 2013: Prologue to the work La violencia contra las mujeres: el amor como coartada by E. Bosch, V. Ferrer et al., Barcelona Anthropos, 
 2015: Edition of the Alexandra Kollontai work Autobiografía de una mujer sexualmente emancipada y otros textos sobre el amor (The Autobiography of a Sexually Emancipated Communist Woman), Horas y Horas, Madrid,

References

External links

 

1961 births
Living people
People from Santander, Spain
Spanish philosophers
Spanish women academics
Spanish women philosophers
Spanish translators
Spanish women's rights activists
Spanish feminists
20th-century Spanish women writers
21st-century Spanish women writers
University of Salamanca alumni
Autonomous University of Madrid alumni
Academic staff of the Complutense University of Madrid
English–Spanish translators
Feminist philosophers
Anti-pornography feminists